Wo Yeung Shan, officially known as Wo Yang Shan, is the sixth-highest peak in Hong Kong at a height of . It is located south east of Tai Mo Shan in the New Territories, between Tsuen Wan District and Tai Po District.

Name 
The Cantonese name Wo Yeung Shan (Chinese: : 禾秧山; Jyutping: Wo4 Joeng1 Saan1) literally means "Rice Seedling Mountain".

See also
 List of mountains, peaks and hills in Hong Kong

References

Mountains, peaks and hills of Hong Kong
Tsuen Wan District
Tai Po District